Garra or GARRA may refer to:

 Garra, the garras, a cyprinid genus
 Garra, Iran, a village in Kermanshah Province, Iran
 the Garra people (sometimes Gara) of Kashmir
 a misspelling of the fictional character Gaara from the manga and anime series Naruto
 the Grand American Road Racing Association, a motor sport governing body